Korhan Taviloglu (born 1962 in Istanbul),  Professor of General Surgery

Education

Graduated from  Robert College in  1980 and from  Istanbul University,  Istanbul School of Medicine in  1986 and fulfilled  General Surgery residency at  Istanbul University,  Istanbul School of Medicine, Department of  Surgery in 1991.

Outstanding activities

Appointed as the General Secretary of the European Society for Trauma and Emergency Surgery (ESTES) between 2002 and 2011, President Elect between 2011–2012 and President of ESTES for the term 2012–2013. He was the first surgeon from Turkey to hold this position in Europe.

Medical education

He fulfilled General Surgery residency at Istanbul University, Istanbul School of Medicine, Department of Surgery in 1991. He worked at Baylor College of Medicine between 1992 and 1993. He was appointed Associate Professor of Surgery at Istanbul University, Istanbul School of Medicine, Department of Surgery in 1996 and Professor of surgery in 2002. He worked at Acibadem Healthcare Group between 2003 and 2008 and Florence Nightingale Health Group between 2008 and 2012. He works in his private clinic since 2012. He acts in the editorial board of 40 Medical journals, more than 20 of which are international. He was trained for advanced laparoscopic surgery, robotic surgery and laser surgery. His main fields are: General Surgery, colorectal surgery, proctology and cancer surgery.

References

External links 
 

1962 births
Living people
Turkish surgeons
Robert College alumni
Istanbul University alumni
Physicians from Istanbul